Lincoln Bridge may refer to:

High Bridge, Lincoln, United Kingdom, also known as "Lincoln Bridge"

United States
 Abraham Lincoln Memorial Bridge, between LaSalle and Oglesby, Illinois
 Lincoln Memorial Bridge, in Vincennes, Indiana
 Abraham Lincoln Bridge, carries I-65 across the Ohio River between Louisville, Kentucky and Jeffersonville, Indiana
 Lincoln Covered Bridge, a covered bridge in Woodstock, Vermont

See also
 Juárez–Lincoln International Bridge, between Laredo, Texas, U.S. and Nuevo Laredo, Tamaulipas, Mexico
 Lincoln Highway Bridge (disambiguation)
 Lincoln Trail Bridge, between Cannelton, Indiana and Hawesville, Kentucky
 Linkin' Bridge, a singing group which performed in America's Got Talent (season 11)